Nāser Houshmand Vaziri (Persian: ناصر هوشمند وزیری; born 1946) is an Iranian sculptor.

Biography 
Naser Houshmand Vaziri was born in 1946 in Hamedan, Pahlavi Iran. At the age of five he moved with his parents to Tehran. He considers his mother as the single most important influence on him as well as his artistic life. He is a graduate of the Fine Arts Faculty of University of Tehran. 

After graduating from university, Mr Vaziri began to work in his sculpting studio on Fātemi Street in Tehran. He continued to work in this location for over thirty years. Around 2005 he closed this studio and moved to Lavāsān, in the Lavasanat District, in the northeast of Tehran, where he works on his life-dream, turning his home and surroundings into a workshop and an in-and-outdoor art museum. He is further digging a tunnel into the mountain, hoping to reach a natural tunnel in the process. In doing so, he is simultaneously turning the dug tunnel into a museum of arts. He intends also to create, amongst other things, the real-size sculptures of all the mythical heroes of Ferdowsi's Shahnameh.

Mr Vaziri is the creator of twenty-five of the real-size sculptures that have been installed in the Laundry Museum of Zanjān and of the thirty sculptures of the Bagh-e Ferdowsi  (The Garden of Ferdowsi) in northern Tehran.

Although stone is his favorite material, he works with such other substances as mud, wood, sand, glass, fibreglass, ceramic, metal and cement. He works both in classical and modern styles of sculpting. He is further a taxidermist. The sculptor and painter Roksānā Houshmand Vaziri and the physicist and sculptor Rāmā Houshmand Vaziri are daughters of Nāser Houshmand Vaziri.

Notes and references

External links
 Official Website of Nāser Houshmand Vaziri.
 Photographs of Nāser Houshmand Vaziri, by Masoud Soheili, 2004: .
 Some photographs of the Laundary Museum of Zanjān: Main entrance (1), interior (2), interior (3).
 Javād Montazeri, The Sculptor of Lavāsān, in Persian, Jadid Online, 8 May 2009, .Audio slideshow:  (5 min 15 sec).

People from Hamadan
University of Tehran alumni
1946 births
Living people
20th-century Iranian sculptors
21st-century Iranian sculptors